The forelock or foretop is a part of a horse's mane, that grows from the animal's poll and falls forward between the ears and onto the forehead. Some breeds, particularly pony breeds, have a naturally thick forelock, while other breeds, such as many Thoroughbreds, have a thinner forelock. Primitive wild equines such as the Przewalski's horse with a naturally short, upright mane generally have no hair falling forward onto the forehead.  Other equidae such as donkeys and zebras, have no discernible forelock at all.

Purpose
Little research has been published on the purpose of the forelock. However, the thick forelock is more prevalent in breeds developed in the cold, wet climates of northern Europe and is minimal on wild horse subspecies and other equine species adapted to hot, dry climates, such as the zebra or donkey. It tends to be fine and thin on many oriental horse breeds, even if they otherwise have long manes and tails.  Thus, it may play a role in temperature regulation and to keep pests at bay.

Grooming
In competition the forelock is braided for some events, such as those in the dressage and hunt seat disciplines. Conversely, some breeds, such as the Andalusian, are usually shown with a long, full, forelock that is never braided. Other breeds may confine the forelock with rubber bands and anchor it to the bridle. The forelock may also be roached (shaved off) in some competitions, such as polo.

Human use
Forelock is slang for a human hairstyle popular in the 1980s. In the 19th century, it was a common salute where a person saluted another by "tugging the forelock" (see Salute).

See also
 Tail (horse)

References

Horse anatomy